Gobiopsis atrata, the New Zealand black goby, is a species of goby endemic to the marine waters around northern New Zealand where it occurs in tide pools and on reefs down to depths of about .  It lives in narrow crevices and is most commonly seen with its head poking out of its lair to which it will hastily retreat if disturbed.  This species can reach a length of  TL.

References
 Tony Ayling & Geoffrey Cox, Collins Guide to the Sea Fishes of New Zealand,  (William Collins Publishers Ltd, Auckland, New Zealand 1982) 

Gobiidae
Endemic marine fish of New Zealand
Fish described in 1933